
This is a list of aircraft in alphabetical order beginning with 'Br' through 'Bz'.

Br–Bz

Bradley 

(Chico, CA)
 Bradley BA-100 Aerobat
 Bradley BA-200 ATAC
 Bradley BA-300 Himat

Bradley 

(Curtiss Bradley, Tulsa, OK)
 Bradley LRB-1

Bradley 

(Ben R. Bradley, Fort Lauderdale, FL)
 Bradley Imp

Brædstrup 

 Brædstrup Ultralet Fly BUF 1

Brain 

(Jacob T & Jacob J Brain, Paterson, NJ)
 Brain 1933 monoplane

Braley Beezle Bug 

((Thomas) Braley Aircraft Co, 211 E Douglas Ave and 6400 E Franklin Rd, Wichita, KS)
 Braley B-1
 Braley B2-K5
 Braley B2-R5
 Braley B2-J6
 Braley B-2C6

Brändli 

(Max Brändli)
 Brändli BX-2 Cherry

Brandt
(Michel Brandt)
 Brandt Kochab

Brantly 

(Brantly Helicopter Corp)
 Brantly B-1
 Brantly B-2
 Brantly B-2A
 Brantly B-2B
 Brantly B-3
 Brantly 305
 Brantly HO-3
 Brantly-Hynes H-5T

Bratu

(Romulus Bratu)
 Bratu 220

Bratukhin 

 Bratukhin AK
 Bratukhin Omega
 Bratukhin Omega II
 Bratukhin 2MG
 Bratukhin VNP
 Bratukhin G-2
 Bratukhin G-3
 Bratukhin G-4
 Bratukhin B-5
 Bratukhin B-6
 Bratukhin B-7
 Bratukhin B-8
 Bratukhin B-9
 Bratukhin B-10
 Bratukhin B-11
 Bratukhin B-12

Braunschweig

(TU-Braunschweig, Institut für Luftfahrtmeßtechnik und Flugmeteorologie)
 Braunschweig LF-1 Zaunkönig

Brazil Lion 

((Lion Aircraft Co, Chicago, IL / Brazil Aircraft Corp., Brazil, IN]]
 Brazil Lion Safety Plane

Brditschka

see also HB-Flugtechnik
 Brditschka HB-3
 Brditschka HB-21
 Brditschka HB-23
 Militky-Brditschka MB-E1

Breda 
(Società Italiana Ernesto Breda)

Bredelet-Gros

 Bredelet-Gros BG-01 Gerfaut

Breecher 

(Ray N. Breecher)
 Breecher 1936 monoplane

Breese 
(Breese Aircraft Corp, Portland, OR)
 Breese-Dallas Model 1 - (Breese & (Charles) Dallas Inc.)
 Breese-Wilde Model 5 - prototype Breese 5
 Breese 5
 Breese Junior
 Breese LP-2
 Breese LT-1
 Breese Penguin
 Breese R-6-3
 Breese R-6-C
 Breese & Dallas X
 Michigan Model 1
 Breese-Wild - prototype Breese 5

Breezer Aircraft gmbh

 Breezer Breezer

Breezy 

(Robert Liposky, Charles Roloff, Carl Unger, Oak Lawn, IL)
 Breezy RLU-1

Breguet 

(Société Anonyme des Ateliers d’Aviation Louis BREGUET)

Bretthauer
 Bretthauer Lewann DD-1

Brewster 

(Claude Brewster, Toledo, OH)
 Brewster 1936 biplane

Brewster 

(Brewster and Co, Aircraft Div, Long Island City, NY)
 Brewster 33A
 Brewster B-139
 Brewster B-239
 Brewster B-339
 Brewster B-439
 Brewster B-340
 Brewster A-32
 Brewster A-34
 Brewster Bermuda
 Brewster F2A Buffalo
 Brewster F3A Corsair
 Brewster SB2A Buccaneer
 Brewster SBA
 Brewster-Fleet B-1
 Brewster R340

Briegleb

see also: Sailplane Corporation of America
 Briegleb BG-6
 Briegleb BG-7
 Briegleb BG-8
 Briegleb BG 12
 Briegleb TG-9
 Briegleb TG-13

Briffaud

(Georges Briffaud)
 Briffaud GB.4
 Briffaud GB.5
 Briffaud GB.6
 Briffaud GB.8
 Briffaud GB.9
 Briffaud GB.10 Pou-Push
 Briffaud GB.11
 Briffaud GB.60
 Briffaud GB.80

Briggs 

(Harold H Briggs, Beaverton, OR)
 Briggs Briggster
 Briggs Special
 Briggs-Marion

Brink (aircraft constructor)

 Brink Model B Aeronca conversion?

Brinn 

(Daniel J Brinn, Garden City, KS)
 Brinn SA-3

Bristol 

(designations for aircraft built prior to 1923 were applied retroactively)

Bristol

(Uriel Bristol, Sunny Isle, St Croix, Virgin Islands)
 Bristol BX-200

British Aerospace

(BAe, British Aerospace, United Kingdom)
 BAe 125
 BAe 146
 BAe 748
 BAe ATP
 BAe C-29
 BAe EAP
 BAe/McDonnell-Douglas Harrier
 BAe Hawk
 BAe Jetstream
 BAe Jetstream 41
 BAe Nimrod
 British Aerospace Nimrod AEW3
 BAe/McDonnell-Douglas T-45 Goshawk
 Avro RJ
 BAe CT-155 Hawk Canadian Armed Forces
 British Aerospace P.125
 British Aerospace HOTOL

British Aircraft Company

(BAC, British Aircraft Company, United Kingdom)
 BAC Planette
 BAC Drone
 BAC VIII Bat-Boat

British Aircraft Corporation

(BAC, British Aircraft Corporation, United Kingdom)
 BAC Lightning
 BAC Jet Provost
 BAC VC-10
 BAC One-Eleven
 BAC Strikemaster
 BAC TSR-2
 Aérospatiale/BAC Concorde

British Aircraft Manufacturing

(BA, British Aircraft Manufacturing Company, United Kingdom)
 BA Cupid
 BA Double Eagle
 BA Eagle
 BA Swallow

British Deperdussin
(British Deperdussin Aeroplane Syndicate. / British Deperdussin Aeroplane Co., Ltd.)
 British Depurdussin Seagull

British Gyroplanes Ltd.

 BGL Tyro Gyro Mk 2

British Klemm 

(British Klemm Aeroplane Company)
 British Klemm B.K. Swallow
 British Klemm B.K.1 Eagle
 British Klemm B.A.3 Cygnet

British Taylorcraft 

(see Taylorcraft Aeroplanes (England) Limited)

Britten-Norman 

 Britten-Norman Finibee
 Britten-Norman Islander
 Britten-Norman Defender
 Britten-Norman Trislander
 Britten-Norman Nymph
 Project Fresson

BRM Aero 

 BRM Aero Bristell
 BRM Aero Bristell UL
 BRM Aero Bristell HD
 BRM Aero Bristell LSA
 BRM Aero Bristell RG

BRM Costruções Aeronáuticas

(Pero Pinheiro, Portugal)
BRM Argos
BRM Citius
BRM Land Africa
BRM Okavango

Brochet 

(Avions Maurice Brochet / Constructions Aéronautiques Maurice Brochet)
 Brochet Beynes-CAU
 Brochet Brocheteau
 Brochet MB.20
 Brochet MB.30
 Brochet MB.40
 Brochet MB.50 Pipistrelle
 Brochet MB.60 Barbastrelle
 Brochet MB.70
 Brochet MB.71
 Brochet MB.72
 Brochet MB.73
 Brochet MB.76
 Brochet MB.80
 Brochet MB.81
 Brochet MB.83
 Brochet MB.84
 Brochet MB.100
 Brochet MB.101
 Brochet MB.110
 Brochet MB.120

Brock

( also Brock-Stinson - Walter L. Brock, Chicago, IL]]
 Brock 1919 biplane
 Brock Exhibition Monoplane
 Brock-Stinson
 Brock Loop Tractor

Brock

(Ken Brock Manufacturing Inc. Santa Ana, CA)
 Brock Avion
 Brock KB-1
 Brock KB-2 Freedom Machine
 Brock KB-3

Brodeau 

(André Brodeau)
 Brodeau 7

Brodhead 

(Arthur L. Brodhead, Miami, FL)
 Brodhead AS-1 Albee Sport

Brokaw-Jones

(Brokaw Aviation Inc (Dr Burgon F Brokaw & Ernest R Jones), Leesburg, FL)
 Brokaw-Jones BJ-520 Bullet

Bromon

(Bromon Aircraft Company)
 Bromon Br-2000

Brooklands Aerospace 

 Brooklands Aerospace Firemaster 65

Broughton-Blaney

 Broughton-Blaney Brawny

Brown

(Louis H. Brown, Toledo, OH)
 Brown 1927 biplane

Brown

((Thoburn C. & William R.) Brown Metalplane Co, S 168 Post St, Spokane, WA)
 Brown Metalark I
 Brown Metalark II
 Brown Metalark II
 Brown Silver Streak

Brown

(aka Ben Brown - Benjamin Brown, Lawrence, KS)
 Brown SC
 Brown SC Diamond Wing

Brown

(C.L. Brown, Rushville MO.)
 Brown 1931 monoplane
 Brown 1935 monoplane
 Brown B

Brown

(H.F. Brown, Wichita, KS)
 Brown Special

Brown

(William Brown Jr., Fall Creek, WI)
 Brown 1931 monoplane

Brown

(Alden Brown, San Francisco, CA)
 Brown racer

Brown 

(Benjamin Brown, Lawrence, KS)
 SC Diamond Wing

Brown 

(Lawrence W Brown, Clover Field, Santa Monica, CA, 1931: Brown Aircraft Co, Montebello, CA)
 Brown 1926 parasol monoplane
 Brown 1927 monoplane
 Brown 1929 monoplane
 Brown B-1 Racer
 Brown B-2 Racer
 Brown B-3
 Brown B-3 Super Sport
 Brown Special (Mexico)
 Brown L-20 Brownie (possibly L-25)

Brown-Mercury

((Lawrence W) Brown-Mercury Aircraft Corp (with R T Leonard), 1172 E Slauson Ave, Los Angeles, CA)
 Brown-Mercury C-2
 Brown-Mercury C-3 Trimotor

Brown-Young 

((Willis C) Brown-(Richard) Young; aka Columbia Aircraft Co, Tulsa, OK)
 Brown-Young BY-1
 Columbia BY-1

Browning 

(J.B. Browning and Ben E. Cayler, Oceanside and Encinitas, CA)
 Browning C-1

Brubaker 

(Wayne Chester Brubaker, Terre Hill, PA)
 Brubaker B-2

Bruggeman 

(Clarence W Bruggeman, Norfolk, NE)
 Bruggeman Nini Bandido

Brügger 

 Brügger MB-1 Colibri
 Brügger MB-2 Colibri 2
 Brügger MB-3
 Brügger Papillon

Brumby Aircraft Australia 

 Brumby 600
 Brumby 610 Evolution
 Brumby Aircruiser

Brun-Cottan
 Brun-Cottan Patrol flying boat
 Brun-Cottan H.B.2 flying boat

Brunner-Winkle

((Joe & Harry) Brunner-(William E) Winkle Aircraft Corp, 17 Haverkamp St, Glendale, NY)
 Brunner-Winkle Bird A
 Brunner-Winkle Bird B

Brush 

(Joseph Brush, Riverdale, NJ)
 Brush A

Brutsche Aircraft Corporation

(Salt Lake City, UT)
 Brutsche Freedom 40
 Brutsche Freedom 180 STOL
 Brutsche Freedom 210 STOL

Bryan

(Leland D. Bryan)
 Bryan Special
 Bryan Model I Autoplane
 Bryan Model II Autoplane
 Bryan Model III Autoplane
 Bryan Model IV Autoplane

Bryan-Laird 

(J C Bryan & Charles Laird, Greer College, Greer Airways, 2024 S Wabash Ave, Chicago, IL)
 Bryan-Laird B-1B

Bryant 

((Leland A) Bryant Aircraft Syndicate, Vail Field, Bell Gardens, CA)
 Bryant 1927 monoplane(Dole Race entrant, christened Angel of Los Angeles)

Brysacz 

 Brysacz Model 2

Brzeski

(Henryk Brzeski)
 Brzeski Iskra

BSAS

(Braddick Specialised Air Services International (pty.) Ltd. P.O.Box 2189 M.E.C.C KZN 4301 South Africa)
 BSAS C-47-65ARTP Turbo Dakota
 BSAS C-47-67RTP Turbo Dakota
 BSAS C-47-67FTP Turbo Dakota

Bucciero 

(Renato Bucciero)
 Bucciero SVIT

Buchanan

(Buchanan Aircraft Corporation, Queensland, Australia)
 Buchanan BAC-204 Ozzie Mozzie

Buchanan 

(William O. Buchanan, Long Beach, CA)
 Buchanan Zipper

Buckenberg 

(Clarence Rudolph Buckenberg, Larchwood, IA)
 Buckenberg 1932 monoplane

Bücker 

(Bücker Flugzeugbau)
 Bücker Bü 131 Jungmann/KXBu Navy Experimental Type Bu Primary Trainer
 Bücker Bü 133 Jungmeister
 Bücker Bü 134
 Bücker Bü 180 Student 
 Bücker Bü 181 Bestmann
 Bücker Bü 182 Kornett

Buckeye

(Buckeye Industries Inc of Argos, IN)
Buckeye Dream Machine
Buckeye Eagle
Buckeye Eclipse
Buckeye Endeavor
Buckeye Falcon

Buckley 
(Buckley Aircraft Co.)
 Buckley F-1
 Buckley LC-4

Budd 

(Edward G Budd Mfg Co, Philadelphia, PA)
 Budd BB-1 Pioneer
 Budd RB Conestoga
 Budd C-93 Conestoga

Buecker 

(Carl Buecker, Ft Wayne, IN)
 Buecker Skylark

Buethe 

(W.B. Buethe Enterprise Inc)
 Buethe Barracuda

Buffington 

Paul W. Buffington, Springfield, OH
 Buffington WE-3B Lady Jamy

Bugatti 

 Bugatti Model 100

Buhl

 Buhl CA-1 Airster
 Buhl CA-3/CW-3 Airster
 Buhl Airsedan
 Buhl Junior Airsedan
 Buhl Sport Airsedan
 Buhl Senior Airsedan
 Buhl Bull Pup
 Buhl A-1 Autogiro

Bullock

(Walter Bullock)
 Bullock-Curtiss Little Looper
 Dallman Little Looper
 Bullock-Curtiss Pusher

Bulté 

(Avions Bulté & Cie SA / René Bulté)
 Bulté RB.1
 Bulté RB.29
 Bulté RB.30 Sport

Bultzing-Slöwen 

 Bultzing-Slöwen 1909 Biplane-Helicopter

Bunting 

(John F. Bunting, Bothell, WA)
 Bunting A

Bunyard 
(Kenneth L Bunyard, Westchester, NY, Bunyard Airplanes, Flushing, NY)
 Bunyard B-40
 Bunyard BAX-3 Sportsman
 Bunyard BAX-4 Sportsman

Burak
(Stanley Burak)
 Burak XF-4

Burgess 

 Burgess Model A
 Burgess Model B
 Burgess Model C
 Burgess Model D
 Burgess Model E
 Burgess Model F
 Burgess Model G
 Burgess Model H
 Burgess Model I
 Burgess Model J
 Burgess Model U
 Burgess-Dunne Model H
 Burgess Type O Gunbus

Burgfalke
(Burgfalke-Flugzeugbau)
 Burgfalke M-150 Schulmeister

Burgoyne-Stirling

 Burgoyne-Stirling Dicer

Burke 

(Burke Aircraft Co, 704 Townsend St, Chicago, IL)
 Burke Model 1

Burkholdt 

(Fred & Sanford Burkholdt, Minneapolis, MN)
 Burkholdt 1927 monoplane

Burleson 

 Burleson Rockford Twister

Burlingame 

(Elmer A. Burlingame, Boston, MA)
 Burlingame Imp

Burnelli 

(also see CCF & Continental)
 Burnelli A-1
 Burnelli CG-1
 Burnelli GX-3
 Burnelli OA-1
 Burnelli RB-1
 Burnelli RB-2
 Burnelli UB-14
 Burnelli CB-16
 Burnelli UB-20
 Uppercu-Burnelli CB-300
 Burnelli CBY-3 Loadmaster
 Uppercu-Burnelli UB-SS
 Remington-Burnelli Airliner
 Remington-Burnelli RB-1
 Remington-Burnelli RB-2
 Remington-Burnelli Transport
 Uppercu-Burnelli UB-14
 Uppercu-Burnelli UB-20
 Burnelli Wing
 Burnelli-Carisi Biplane
 Burnelli-Continental KB-1
 Burnelli-Continental KB-3
 Uppercu-Burnelli-Aeromarine-Klemm Model B

Burns 

(Art Burns & J E "Brig" Young (Jung), Los Angeles, CA)
 Burns 1925 biplane

Burns 

(Burns Aircraft Co., Starkville, MS)
 Burns BA-42

Burrell 

(Leslie K. Burrell, Garden Grove, CA)
 Burrell Sport

Burrows 

(Riley Burrows, Gardena and Glendale, CA)
 Burrows R-1
 Burrows R-4
 Burrows R-5

Burt 

(Robert F. Burt, Pomona, CA)
 Burt RB-2 Special

Buscaylet-Béchereau

 Buscaylet-Béchereau C.1
 Buscaylet-Bechereau BB.2 (alternative designation for the C.1)

Buscaylet-de Monge

 Buscaylet-de Monge 5/1
 Buscaylet-de Monge 5/2
 Buscaylet-de Monge 7/4
 Buscaylet-de Monge 7/5

Bush

((C J) Bush Welding Works, 117 Greene St, Piqua, OH)
 Bush B-1

Bushby 

(Bushby Aircraft Inc. - Robert W. Bushby)
 Bushby Midget Mustang
 Bushby Mustang II

Bushcaddy

(Bushcaddy Aircraft Canada, Lachute, Quebec, Canada)
Bushcaddy R-80
Bushcaddy R-120
Bushcaddy L-160
Bushcaddy L-162 Max
Bushcaddy L-164

Bushey-McGrew 

(Ralph Bushey & C F McGrew, Los Angeles, CA)
 ushey-McGrew B7M1 Bumblebee

Bushmaster

(Bushmaster Aircraft Corp.)
 Stout Bushmaster 2000

Bussen 

(Eugene A. Bussen, Jefferson Barracks, MO)
 Bussen B-1

Butler 

(C. Arthur Butler)
 Butler ABA-1
 Butler ABA-2 BAT

Butler 

(Butler Co, 325 S Broadway St, Butler, IN)
 Butler Yellow Jacket

Butler 
Butler Aircraft Corporation, division of Butler Manufacturing Corporation, Kansas City MO.
 Butler Blackhawk
 Butler Blackhawk Junior
 Butler Coach
 Butler Skyway
 Butler Leuthart

Butterfly

(Butterfly Aero, Oakville, WA)
Butterfly Banty

The Butterfly LLC

The Butterfly The Ultralight Butterfly 
The Butterfly Super Sky Cycle
The Butterfly The Aurora Butterfly
The Butterfly The Golden Butterfly
The Butterfly The Turbo Golden Butterfly
The Butterfly The Emperor Butterfly
The Butterfly The Monarch Butterfly

Butters

(William A. Butters & Associates, Johnstown, PA)
 Butters 1930 monoplane

Butterworth 

(G.N. Butterworth, West Kingston, RI)
 Butterworth Westland Whirlwind II

Büttner Propeller

(Gerald Büttner - Obernkirchen, Obernkirchen, Germany)
Büttner Crazy Flyer
Büttner Crazy Plane
Büttner Easy Plane

Butz

 Butz F-1

Buxton 

(Jay Buxton, Hawthorne, CA)
 Buxton B-4-A

Buzzard

SEE Snyder

Buzzman 

(Buzzman ARVS / L'il Hustler Ultralight Aviation)
 Buzzman L'il Buzzard
 Buzzman L'il Buzzard TWS 582
 Buzzman L'il Hustler
 Buzzman L'il Hustler SS
 Buzzman L'il Hustler TR

Bye Aerospace
(Denver, Colorado, United States)
Bye Aerospace Sun Flyer 2
Bye Aerospace Sun Flyer 4

Bylinkin

(Fedor Ivanovich Bylinkin)
 Bylinkin 1910 monoplane

Byron

(Charles Byron, East Brunswick, NJ)
 Byroncraft A1

References

 List of aircraft (B)

de:Liste von Flugzeugtypen/B
fr:Liste des aéronefs (B)